Kai Ephron is an American and British film director. He is best known for his work on the feature film Benjamin Troubles.

Career
Kai started his career as a lead actor in Flesh Suitcase (1995) and worked as a location manager in Eagle Eye, Inception, Super 8 and many more. His debut feature film Benjamin Troubles had been screened in Santa Fe Film Festival and Sedona Film Festival.

Filmography

References

External links 
 
 

Living people
American film directors
1965 births